The African Development Trophy also called CAR Development Trophy is a rugby union tournament consisting of 16 teams played in the continent of Africa, formerly named the CAR Castel Beer Trophy. It is organised by Rugby Africa and was also known as the CAR Super 16. The tournament contains the teams in the second division of African rugby, below those playing in the Africa Cup. The competition is divided into north and south sections with two pools of four in each section. The winners of these pools will go on to play each other in the final where the winner of both north and south will be found.

Summary

Second division

Third division

See also
Africa Cup

External links
Official website

 
2004 establishments in Africa
Rugby union competitions in Africa for national teams